Ralph Bunche House may refer to:

Ralph Johnson Bunche House, Queens, New York, a National Historic Landmark and listed on the National Register of Historic Places in Queens County, New York
Ralph Bunche House (Washington, D.C.), listed on the National Register of Historic Places in Washington, D.C.
Ralph J. Bunche House, Los Angeles, California, listed on the National Register of Historic Places in Los Angeles County, California

See also
Ralph Bunche Historic District, Glasgow, Kentucky, listed on the National Register of Historic Places listings in Barren County, Kentucky
Ralph Bunche High School, King George, Virginia, listed on the NRHP in Virginia